Ruan Christov Venter (born 11 May 1992) is a South African professional rugby union player who most recently played with the . His regular position is lock.

Career

Youth

As a scholar at Laerskool Vastrap in Rustenburg, Venter represented local side  at the 2005 Under-13 Craven Week tournament. He was also included in the South African Under-18 High Performance Squad in 2010. Towards the end of 2010, he was also part of the  squad that played in the 2010 Under-19 Provincial Championship competition.

In 2011, he was included in the South Africa Under-20 team that played at the 2011 IRB Junior World Championship in Italy. After being an unused substitute in their opening match of the tournament against Scotland, Venter started their next two matches against Ireland and England. However, a knee injury ruled him out of the remainder of the tournament.

He only returned to action in late 2012, when he represented the  side in the 2012 Under-21 Provincial Championship competition and also played in the same competition in 2013.

Golden Lions

Pumas

References

Alumni of Monument High School
South African rugby union players
Living people
1992 births
People from Rustenburg
Golden Lions players
Pumas (Currie Cup) players
South Africa Under-20 international rugby union players
Rugby union locks
Rugby union players from North West (South African province)